Coleophora syriaca is a moth of the family Coleophoridae. It is found in Syria.

References

syriaca
Moths of the Middle East
Moths described in 1942